The Matt N. Hill Homestead Barn near McCall, Idaho was built in about 1903. It was listed on the National Register of Historic Places in 1982.

It has a steep roof and a pointed hay hood.

In 1980 the barn was in very good condition and was used for storing farm equipment. Its roof shingles had been replaced by a metal roof, but its interior was virtually unchanged from its original status.

References

Barns on the National Register of Historic Places in Idaho
Buildings and structures completed in 1903
Valley County, Idaho
Finnish-American culture in Idaho
Finnish-American history
Barns with hay hoods